James Dalgleish Kellie-MacCallum  (1845 – 7 September 1932) was a British police officer who served as Chief Constable of Northamptonshire County Constabulary for fifty years, from 1881 to 1931.

Kellie-MacCallum was born at Braco Castle, Perthshire and educated at Loretto School and Trinity College, Glenalmond. He was commissioned into the 79th Foot (later the Cameron Highlanders) in 1865. He served in the Ashanti War of 1873–1874, attached to the Black Watch, and was recommended for the Victoria Cross during the advance on Kumasi. He did not receive it, but was mentioned in despatches. He retired from the Army in 1876 with the rank of lieutenant.

He was awarded the King's Police Medal (KPM) in December 1912, appointed Officer of the Order of the British Empire (OBE) in the 1920 civilian war honours, and Commander of the Order of the British Empire (CBE) in the 1924 Birthday Honours.

Footnotes

References
Obituary, The Times, 15 September 1932

1845 births
1932 deaths
People from Perth and Kinross
People educated at Loretto School, Musselburgh
People educated at Glenalmond College
Queen's Own Cameron Highlanders officers
British military personnel of the Third Anglo-Ashanti War
British Chief Constables
Commanders of the Order of the British Empire
English recipients of the Queen's Police Medal